The Minnesota Children's Museum is a children's museum in Saint Paul, Minnesota. Founded in 1981 in Minneapolis, the museum moved to St. Paul in 1995.

The museum includes natural exhibits of Minnesota, developmental learning areas for small children, a creativity and problem- solving area, and national traveling exhibits .

History 
On December 12, 1981, the Minnesota's AwareHouse, the first children's museum, opened  downtown Minneapolis. Attendance grew to 80,000, and the museum quickly outgrew the original space in downtown Minneapolis. In 1985, the museum moved to an old blacksmith's shop in Bandana Square, transforming dirt walls into  of galleries. By the early 1990s, the museum's visitors and exhibits again outgrew the space in Bandana Square.

Three of the most popular exhibits moved from Bandana Square to the new museum: Habitot; the Crane (which moved to the World Works gallery), and the Maze (which moved to Earth World and became the giant anthill). 

Today, more than 6 million children and their families have visited the Museum. In September 2012, The Museum planned a $26 million expansion  and began renovations in late 2015.

On December 5, 2016, the Children's Museum closed until its $30 million renovation was completed. It would reveal a different layout and 10 new exhibits, along with a cafe and coffee bar, more bathrooms and elevators. On June 7, 2017, the Museum reopened to the public.

Galleries 
The Scramble: Four-Story Climber, Giant Spiral Slide & 40-Foot High Catwalk
''Forces at Play: Ping Pong Ball Launchers, Wacky Car Wash & Bubbles GaloreShipwreck Adventures: An “Underwater” Adventure Based on a Real ShipwreckImaginopolis: Imaginative Play Space – Now Featuring: Cosmic JunkyardSprouts: Sensory Play Space for Babies and Toddlers (for ages 3 and under)Creativity Jam: Now Featuring – The Play LoungeOur World: Vibrant Pretend Town with a Fire Station, Post Office & MoreThe Studio: Everchanging Maker Space – Now Featuring: Invitation to DrawThe Backyard: An Immersive Natural World with a Twist – Outdoor Exhibit Open SeasonallyTip Top Terrace'': Big Frame House, Sensory Garden & Musical Playground – Outdoor Exhibit Open Seasonally 
Special gallery offers traveling exhibits from around the world

References

External links
Official site

1981 establishments in Minnesota
Children's museums in Minnesota
Museums in Saint Paul, Minnesota